One of the primary reasons why Los Angeles was awarded an American League expansion franchise for the 1961 season was because actor/singer turned broadcast mogul Gene Autry wanted to secure radio broadcast rights for the newly planned Los Angeles American League franchise.  His KMPC (710 AM, now KSPN) was the radio home of the Los Angeles Dodgers, from the time they arrived from Brooklyn, New York in time for the 1958 baseball season, and actually came away from the 1960 Winter Meetings with his own baseball team.

Radio
Naturally, KMPC became the longtime radio outlet for Angels games throughout Southern California, although there was a period from 1997 that KRLA/1110 and 1998 to 2002 that KLAC (570 AM) became the team's flagship radio home.  However, the Angels returned to their ancestral radio home at KSPN 710 AM, now since rebranded 710 ESPN, Los Angeles's ESPN Radio-operated outlet from the 2003 through 2007 seasons.

In 2006 team owner Arte Moreno purchased his own radio station, KMXE (830 AM), an Orange County-licensed Spanish-language formatted station.   By mid-2006, 830 AM's programming was mostly in English (the principal exception being Angels games in Spanish), and the station's call sign was changed to KLAA. In October 2007, the Angels announced that KWKW "ESPN Deportes 1330" would carry games in Spanish, and AM 830 will carry Angels games in English, although games that conflict with Anaheim Ducks games will be transferred to another station.

In time for the 2008 baseball season AM 830 became the English-language outlet for Angels games, when their contract with KSPN expired.
 
In 2009, former Dodger radio flagship KFWB joined the Angels radio network, serving as a co-flagship of sorts alongside KLAA, carrying Monday through Friday games.  It provided fans who live in certain parts of the Los Angeles market with a secondary outlet to listen to games.

In 2010, KSPN-AM AM 710 simulcast at least 60 games with KLAA to reach areas of the northwest area of the Los Angeles radio market. The deal returns the Angels to their old radio station from 2007. For 2011 KSPN will simulcast with KLAA for 25–30 weekend games.

On May 15, 2012, the Angels signed a radio rights deal with syndicator Compass Media to distribute 25 games to a nationwide audience, in a game-of-the-week format. These games would be produced separately from the KLAA broadcasts, and will feature veteran play-by-play men Chris Carrino and Steve Quis, with former New York Mets general manager and current SiriusXM sports talk show host Steve Phillips and former MLB player Darryl Hamilton as color commentators. Many of the games, if not all, will air on such stations as WFAN New York City (radio flagship of the Mets), WTEM Washington, D.C. (a Baltimore Orioles affiliate), WQXI Atlanta, WYGM Orlando, and KFNC Houston.

Television
On the television side, the then-KHJ-TV (Channel 9) was the team's original home, until the start of the 1964 season, when Autry moved the Angels to his then-newly purchased KTLA (Channel 5).  KTLA remained the Angels' home for 32 seasons (while also carrying Dodgers games from 1993 to 2001).  The team returned to Channel 9, by this time renamed KCAL-TV, because The Walt Disney Company bought a stake of the team and eventually became the full owner after Gene Autry's death in 1998.  At the time the broadcast rights were secured before the 1996 season, Disney had owned KCAL-TV, until they were forced to sell the station when it bought ABC. Due to FCC regulations at the time, Disney could not own two television stations in the same city, as ABC owns KABC-TV.

KCAL-TV remained the home of Angels baseball for 10 seasons, until the 2005 season.  The station began broadcasting Dodgers games, starting in the 2006 season.  When Moreno took over as owner, starting in the 2004 season, he made sure more games were available for fans.  Most Angels fans were accustomed to seeing probably more than 100 games annually, but the Angels televised more than 140 games, the most in franchise history.  In addition to the 50 telecasts each on KCAL-TV and FSN West, the remaining telecasts were spread between UHF outlets KPXN-TV (Channel 30, a Pax/i O&O) and the hometown-based independent station KDOC-TV (Channel 56).  In 2005, just KCAL-TV and FSN West combined to televise about 140 games.

On April 3, 2006, the Angels and its cable broadcaster partner, Fox Sports West, finalized a 10-year, $500 million deal.  This deal voids the previous one in which Fox Sports West would only televise a minimum of 50 games annually until 2008.  In this current deal, Fox Sports West would own the rights to 150 locally televised games annually, with 100 airing on West, while its sister over-the-air station, KCOP-TV (Channel 13) will televise 50 contests.  The remaining games would either air exclusively on ESPN's Sunday Night Baseball or on Fox Television's Saturday Baseball Game of the Week package.

In 2009, Fox Sports West began broadcasting 25 additional games to its schedule, subtracting those from the KCOP package, bringing their total to 125 games.  KCOP-TV's current schedule of 25 games will mostly consist of Sunday afternoon contests, and selected Saturday night games.

In December 2011—the same day news broke of the Angels signing a 10-year, $240 million contract with Albert Pujols—it was announced that the Angels also finalized a new 17-year television deal with Fox Sports West for $2.5 billion.  Like the 2006 deal, this deal voided the previous one.  As part of this new deal, the Angels also obtained a 25% equity stake in Fox Sports West.

Broadcasters
As with any sports team, the Angels have employed a number of radio and television broadcasters over the years. Among the many notable voices to call games for the team have been nationally recognized sportscasters Dick Enberg and Joe Garagiola, late Seattle Mariners announcer Dave Niehaus, late Hall of Fame pitcher Don Drysdale, Hall of Fame outfielder Reggie Jackson, former Detroit Tigers TV voice Mario Impemba, former Arizona Diamondbacks TV announcer Daron Sutton (son of Hall of Famer Don Sutton), Hall of Fame manager Sparky Anderson and current MLB Network announcer Matt Vasgersian.  Enberg is the broadcaster most associated with the Angels, famous for his pet phrases "Oh, my!" and "And the halo shines tonight!".  He used both of these phrases during the World Series' victory celebration of the Angels in 2002 while addressing the crowd.

Other Angels announcers have included Joe Buttitta, Ron Fairly, Bob Starr, Paul Olden, Larry Kahn and Al Conin. Starr and Olden, along with Enberg and Steve Physioc, were also Los Angeles Rams football announcers concurrent with their Angels duties; in fact, Physioc was the last radio play-by-play man of the Rams in their final season in Southern California (1994).  Al Conin broadcast during the 1986 ALCS pennant race against the Red Sox. His broadcasting style was very similar to that of Dodgers' Hall of Famer Vin Scully. Longtime San Diego Padres and New York Yankees legend Jerry Coleman had a brief stint with the Angels in the early 1970s before joining the Padres.

A shake-up in the Angels’ broadcast team for the 2010 season was announced in November 2009. Rory Markas and Mark Gubicza were designated to take over the TV broadcasts in 2010, with Terry Smith and José Mota on radio. The contracts of Steve Physioc and former Major League player Rex Hudler were not renewed after 14 and 11 years' service, respectively, to long suffering viewers relief..

Markas died on January 4, 2010, of an apparent heart attack at his home in Palmdale, California.

The 2009 lineup of Angels broadcasters had been Physioc (TV and radio play-by-play), Rex Hudler (TV and radio analyst), Gubicza (TV analyst), José Mota (lead analyst on the Spanish radio broadcasts), Markas (radio and TV play-by-play), and Smith (radio play-by-play).

During the 2008 Major League Baseball season, Markas worked 75 games on television with Gubicza as analyst; Physioc and Hudler worked the remaining games on TV, but moved to the radio side whenever Markas and Gubicza worked on TV.  Markas continued as the lead radio play-by-play announcer for the games Physioc and Hudler did for TV. Terry Smith continued his role as the No. 2 radio play-by-play man, while José Mota returned to his role as in-game reporter on TV and Spanish radio analyst.

In 2007, Mota and Fox Sports West/Prime Ticket analyst Gubicza had worked 50 telecasts (mostly road) for FSN West and KCOP, while Physioc and Hudler continued as the lead TV broadcast team for the Angels, working the remaining 100 local broadcasts.  Veteran Spanish sportscaster Amaury Pi-Gonzalez joined the team for Spanish radio play-by-play for the 2007 season, replacing Ivan Lara.

Markas and Gubicza had previously worked a three-game series for FSN West between the Angels and Blue Jays at Rogers Centre in Toronto, on August 13–15, 2007.

Terry Smith, who handles mostly the middle innings on radio, has been referred to by some as this generation's Harry Kalas because Smith often uses Kalas' famous phrases as "that ball is out-ta here" on an Angels home run, or "struck him out" when the Angels strike out an opposing batter.  Markas, who used his famous phrase Just another Halo victory! after Angel wins, was also a broadcaster for the USC Basketball team.

Broadcasters through the years

Broadcast outlets throughout the years

Radio (flagship) 
KMPC/KDIS/KSPN (710 AM), 1961–1996, 2003–2007
KRLA (1110 AM), 1997
KLAC (570 AM), 1998–2002
KLAA (830 AM), 2008–present
KTNQ (1020 AM, Spanish), 2001?–2005
KLAA (830 AM), Spanish, 2006–2007; English, 2008–present
KWKW (1330 AM, Spanish), 2008–present

Radio Broadcasters by Year

Radio Network (as of 2013)
Source:

California

Nevada

New Jersey

Utah

Over the air television 
KHJ-TV/KCAL (Channel 9), 1961–1963, 1996–2005
KTLA (Channel 5), 1964–1995
KPXN-TV (Channel 30), 2004
KDOC-TV (Channel 56), 2004
KCOP-TV (Channel 13), 2006–2011, 2012–present (occasional games)

Cable television 
Bally Sports West (formerly Fox Sports West, Prime Ticket, Prime Sports West), 1992–present

Television Broadcasters by Year

See also 
 List of current Major League Baseball announcers

References

 
Lists of Major League Baseball broadcasters
Broadcasters
SportsChannel
Prime Sports
Fox Sports Networks
Bally Sports